Nanjing International School is a non-profit International school in Xian Lin College and University Town, Qixia District, Nanjing, enrolling children age 3 to 18, Pre Kindergarten to Grade 12. There are around 620 students from over 30 countries.

The school offers first language German instruction in Secondary School.

History
The school was opened by a small group of expatriate parents on October 14, 1992, with five students ranging from Grades 1 to 5. Parents established the school because they wanted to provide English language education for their children. In 1996 the school was officially registered by the Nanjing authorities, so its name changed from Nanjing American School to Nanjing International School.

After three years in rented rooms at the Nanjing Foreign Language School (NFLS), the enrollment at the Nanjing International School had expanded, requiring more space than the two classrooms at NFLS. NIS board members approved the renovation of two buildings belonging to the Dingshan hotel. Six rooms were converted into classrooms to accommodate primary/nursery, elementary and middle school students.

In 1997 NIS hired Mr Gez Hayden as the first School Director. Between 1998 and 2000, NIS was accredited by the International Baccalaureate to teach the Middle Years Programme (1998), Diploma Programme (1999) and Primary Years Programme (2000). This made NIS the first IB Continuum School in China. 

The school grew from 35 to 300 students between 1997 and 2003. In 2004, NIS moved to its own purpose-built premises in Xianlin University Town. In 2007 NIS gained accreditation from the Council of International Schools (CIS), New England Association of Schools and Colleges (NEASC) and the National Center for Curriculum and Textbook Development (NCCT). In 2018 NIS was re-accredited by all three agencies and the IB.

Curriculum
It was the first school in China which is fully authorised by International Baccalaureate Organisation to offer the Primary Years (PYP), Middle Years (MYP) and Diploma Programmes (DP).

Facilities 
The total area of the purpose-built campus is 70,000sqm.

Weekend programs
The Japanese Weekend School of Nanjing (南京日本語補習授業校 Nankin Nihongo Hoshū Jugyō Kō), a Japanese weekend program, holds its classes at NIS. Parent run Korean School on Saturdays.

References

External links

 Nanjing International School website
 The International Baccalaureate website
 Council of International Schools website
 New England Association of Schools and Colleges website

Schools in Nanjing
International schools in Jiangsu
Educational institutions established in 1992
International Baccalaureate schools in China
Private schools in China
Association of China and Mongolia International Schools
East Asia Regional Council of Overseas Schools
1992 establishments in China